Paul Jennings Hill (February 6, 1954 – September 3, 2003) was an American minister and anti-abortion terrorist who murdered physician John Britton and Britton's bodyguard, retired Air Force Lieutenant Colonel James Barrett, in 1994. Hill was sentenced to death by lethal injection and was executed on September 3, 2003.

Early life
Paul Hill was born in Miami, Florida, on February 6, 1954, to Oscar Jennings Hill, an airline pilot, and his wife Louise. He was raised in Coral Gables, Florida. At the age of 17, Hill was charged with the assault of his father when his parents attempted to get him treatment for his drug problem. Hill said he experienced a religious conversion two years later in 1973, after being sent to a military school. Hill later enrolled in Belhaven University, where he met his future wife, Karen Demuth, with whom he had three children.

Early career
Hill graduated from Reformed Theological Seminary, where he studied under Greg Bahnsen, a founder of the right-wing Christian Reconstructionist movement. He attended St. Paul Presbyterian Church, which espoused theonomy, a movement related to Reconstructionism. Following his ordination in 1984, Hill became a minister affiliated with both the Presbyterian Church in America and the Orthodox Presbyterian Church. He was excommunicated in 1993 following a number of nationally televised appearances in which he claimed to be the new national spokesperson for "defensive action" against abortion providers and claimed a connection to the Army of God.

Crime, trial, and execution
On July 29, 1994, Hill approached the Ladies Center, an abortion clinic in Pensacola, Florida. When he spotted clinic doctor John Britton and his bodyguard, retired USAF Lieutenant Colonel James H. Barrett, outside the clinic, he fired on both of them at close range with a Mossberg Model 500A 12-gauge pump-action shotgun. Both Britton and Barrett died; Barrett's wife, June, was also wounded. Following the shots, Hill laid his shotgun on the ground and waited to be arrested.

Following his arrest, Hill was brought to trial in the Circuit Court of Florida for the First Circuit, charged with two counts of first-degree premeditated murder, one count of attempted first-degree murder, and one count of shooting into an occupied vehicle. Hill moved, successfully, to be allowed to appear pro se; i.e., he represented himself. He pleaded not guilty on all counts. Hill's motion to use the affirmative defense of justification was denied. According to Hill, his actions were a defensive act, rather than a retribution. On December 6, 1994, Hill was found guilty of the charges and was sentenced to death. Appeals to the First District Court of Appeal, 656 So.2d 1271 (Fla. 1995), and subsequently to the Florida Supreme Court, 688 So.2d 901 (Fla.1996), were unsuccessful. Hill petitioned the Supreme Court of the United States for writ of certiorari (asked the Court to hear his appeal). The petition was denied. 522 U.S. 907 (1997). After losing his automatic appeals, Hill decided to waive the remainder of his appeals.

The execution warrant for Hill was not signed until July 2003, at which time it was signed by Governor Jeb Bush. Hill died by lethal injection in Florida State Prison on September 3, 2003, aged 49. His last words were, "If you believe abortion is a lethal force, you should oppose the force and do what you have to do to stop it. May God help you to protect the unborn as you would want to be protected."

Hill chose Rev. Donald Spitz as his spiritual adviser during the last week of his life. Hill was close friends with Spitz both before and after he killed John Britton and James H. Barrett. Spitz was with Hill during the last week of his life and with Hill when he was executed.

Motives and aftermath
Prior to the murders, Hill sent two position papers to Reconstructionist author Gary North, which set out Hill's views of abortion and why he considered murder of abortionists to be warranted. The papers were followed by three additional letters to North in October 1994. North's responses, issued after the murders, comprised two letters that were made available to the public. The letters rejected and refuted Hill's theological arguments, and concluded that, "...the public will regard your dual assassination as the act of a condemned man outside of God's church and acting on his own in defiance of Bible-revealed law and therefore also God's moral law."

Hill spent almost a decade in prison awaiting his execution. In a statement made before his execution, Hill's views on the murders remained unchanged; he said that he felt no remorse for his actions, and that he expected "a great reward in Heaven". Hill left behind a manuscript manifesto which his backers promised him they would publish. Hill also encouraged others who believe abortion is an illegitimate use of lethal force to "do what you have to do to stop it."

In media
While in police custody, Hill told the media "Now is the time to defend the unborn as to defend a slave that's about to be murdered." Hill's purported ties to the Army of God movement as well as his life and crimes are explored in the feature-length HBO Documentary film Soldiers in the Army of God (2000), directed by Marc Levin and Daphne Pinkerson as part of HBO's America Undercover Series.

Lake of Fire, a 2006 documentary by Tony Kaye on the abortion controversy in the United States, features footage of Hill protesting outside abortion clinics in Florida, and shows footage of Hill's arrest and trial. Hill also says to the filmmaker that "whatever force is justified in defending the life of a born child is also justified in defending the life of an unborn child."

See also
 Capital punishment in Florida
 Capital punishment in the United States
 List of people executed in Florida
 List of people executed in the United States in 2003
 Donald Spitz
 David Trosch
 Eric Rudolph
 John Britton (doctor)
 Shelley Shannon
 Anti-abortion violence

References

1954 births
2003 deaths
21st-century executions by Florida
21st-century executions of American people
1994 murders in the United States
American assassins
American people executed for murder
American anti-abortion activists
Army of God (United States)
Belhaven University alumni
Calvinist and Reformed clergy with criminal convictions
Executed assassins
Executed activists
Executed people from Florida
Former Presbyterians
Members of the clergy convicted of murder
People convicted of murder by Florida
People excommunicated by Presbyterian churches
People executed by Florida by lethal injection
People from Coral Gables, Florida
People from Miami
Perpetrators of religiously motivated violence in the United States
American members of the clergy convicted of crimes
20th-century American clergy